Thomas Sinclair,  (17 December 1857 – 25 November 1940) was an Irish unionist politician.

Sinclair studied at Queen's University, Belfast before working as a surgeon.  He was elected to the Senate of Northern Ireland on its creation in 1921.

He was elected as an Ulster Unionist Party Member of Parliament (MP) for Queen's University of Belfast at the 1923 United Kingdom general election.  From 1935 to 1937, Sinclair served as Deputy Speaker of the Senate of Northern Ireland.  He resigned his Westminster seat on 18 September 1940 by appointment as Steward of the Chiltern Hundreds. but held his Senate seat until his death in November.

The businessman and politician Thomas Sinclair was a relative of Sinclair.

References

1857 births
1940 deaths
Alumni of Queen's University Belfast
Irish Presbyterians
Members of the Senate of Northern Ireland 1921–1925
Members of the Senate of Northern Ireland 1925–1929
Members of the Senate of Northern Ireland 1929–1933
Members of the Senate of Northern Ireland 1933–1937
Members of the Senate of Northern Ireland 1937–1941
UK MPs 1923–1924
UK MPs 1924–1929
UK MPs 1929–1931
UK MPs 1931–1935
UK MPs 1935–1945
Ulster Unionist Party members of the House of Commons of the United Kingdom
Members of the Privy Council of Ireland
Members of the Parliament of the United Kingdom for Queen's University of Belfast
Ulster Unionist Party members of the Senate of Northern Ireland